"Dance to the Music" is a 1967 hit single by soul/funk/rock band Sly and the Family Stone for the Epic/CBS Records label. It was the first single by the band to reach the Billboard Pop Singles Top 10, peaking at #8 and the first to popularize the band's sound, which would be emulated throughout the black music industry and dubbed "psychedelic soul". It was later ranked #223 on Rolling Stones list of the 500 Greatest Songs of All Time.

History

Reluctance to adopt a pop sound
None of the band members particularly liked "Dance to the Music" when it was first recorded and released. The song, and the accompanying Dance to the Music LP, were made at the insistence of CBS Records executive Clive Davis, who wanted something more commercially viable than the band's 1967 LP, A Whole New Thing. Bandleader Sly Stone crafted a formula, blending the band's distinct psychedelic rock leanings with a more pop-friendly sound. The result was what saxophonist Jerry Martini called "glorified Motown beats. 'Dance to the Music' was such an unhip thing for us to do."

About the song
However, "Dance to the Music" did what it was supposed to do: it launched Sly and the Family Stone into the pop consciousness. Even toned down for pop audiences, the band's radical sound caught many music fans and fellow recording artists completely off guard. "Dance to the Music" featured four co-lead singers, black musicians and white musicians in the same band, and a distinct blend of instrumental sounds: rock guitar riffs from Sly's brother Freddie Stone, a funk bassline from Larry Graham, Greg Errico's syncopated drum track,  Sly's gospel-styled organ playing, and Jerry Martini and Cynthia Robinson on the horns.

An unabashed party record, "Dance to the Music" opens with Robinson screaming to the audience, demanding that they "get on up...and dance to the music!" before the Stone brothers and Graham break into an a cappella scat before the song's verses begin. The actual lyrics of the song are sparse and self-referential. The song serves as a Family Stone theme song of sorts, introducing Errico, Robinson, and Martini by name. After calling on Robinson and Martini for their solo, Sly tells the audience that "Cynthia an' Jerry got a message that says...", which Robinson finishes: "All the squares go home!" The Stone Brothers and Graham repeat the a cappella portion before the refrain of the repeated title is  mentioned over and over with the sound of the instruments dropping out, except for the electric guitar, being played in the upper register, before the song's fade.

The song mentions the line: "Ride, Sally, Ride", a lyric from the Wilson Pickett hit song "Mustang Sally" (1966).

Legacy
"Dance to the Music" was one of the most influential songs of the late-1960s. The Sly and the Family Stone sound became the dominating sound in African-American pop music for the next three years, and many established artists, such as The Temptations and their producer Norman Whitfield, Diana Ross & the Supremes, The Impressions, The Four Tops, The 5th Dimension, and War began turning out Family Stone-esque material. The Temptations' single "Cloud Nine" was inspired by "Dance to the Music" and was a top ten hit, winning a Grammy Award. "Dance to the Music" and the later Family Stone singles also helped lead to the development of funk music.

Cover versions and uses in pop culture

 Later in 1968, Sly and the Family Stone released an alternate version of "Dance to the Music" as a novelty single, under the guise The French Fries. This recording was a French language version called "Danse à la Musique", with the group's vocals sped-up in a style similar to that of The Chipmunks.
 In the song "Thank You (Falettinme Be Mice Elf Agin)" (1969), the title is mentioned in the third verse, along with "Everyday People".
 Sly and the Family Stone performed a medley of "Dance to the Music" and "I Want to Take You Higher" on Soul Train on June 29, 1974.
 In 1980, famous Belgian electro-pop band Telex covered "Dance to the Music" for their second album, Neurovision.
 It is heavily sampled by The KLF on their 1988 single "Burn the Bastards", where they chant "Jams have a party" instead of "Dance to the Music".
 It was performed on stage in HBO's 1981 television special The Pee-wee Herman Show.
 The song was covered by the Simple Minds as part of the medley "Love Song/Sun City/Dance to the Music" on their live album Live in the City of Light (1987).
 "Dance for Me (Queen Latifah)", a song on Queen Latifah's 1989 debut album All Hail the Queen samples "Dance to the Music".
 In 1998, "Dance to the Music" was admitted into the Grammy Hall of Fame.
 The song is one of many covers the accordion-based comedy rock band Those Darn Accordions have performed at live shows.
 Billy Joel covered the song and it is featured on his live album 2000 Years: The Millennium Concert.
 In 2001, the DVD for the animated film Shrek added "Dance to the Music" to the additional segment "Shrek in the Swamp Karaoke Dance Party", alongside other classic songs such as "YMCA", "Like a Virgin" and "Baby Got Back".
 The song was also covered by Martin Lawrence in the film Black Knight.
 The song was featured in the 2008 Will Ferrell sports comedy Semi-Pro.
 The cast of the TV show Smash performed this song in the episode "The Coup".
 The song was performed by Madison Cunningham, Falu, Nnenna Freelon, Kalani Peʻa, John Popper and The Isaacs to open the 64th Annual Grammy Awards premiere ceremony on April 3, 2022.
 The song was covered by H.E.R. for Illumination 12th feature film, Minions: The Rise of Gru and featured on the soundtrack of the same name.

Personnel
 Sly Stone: vocals, Hammond organ
 Freddie Stone: vocals, guitar
 Larry Graham: vocals, bass guitar
 Cynthia Robinson: trumpet, vocal ad-libs
 Jerry Martini: saxophone
 Greg Errico:  drums
 Written and produced by Sly Stone

Notes

References
 Selvin, Joel (1998). For the Record: Sly and the Family Stone: An Oral History. New York: Quill Publishing. .

1968 singles
Sly and the Family Stone songs
Grammy Hall of Fame Award recipients
Song recordings produced by Sly Stone
Songs written by Sly Stone
Epic Records singles
1967 songs
Songs about music
Songs about dancing
Columbia Graphophone Company singles